Andrew Johnston (1770 - 28 August 1833) was the president of the Royal College of Surgeons in Ireland (RCSI) in 1817.

Andrew Johnston was to surgeon William Hartigan in 1791 and he entered upon his professional studies in the Royal College of Surgeons in Ireland (RCSI), then situated in Mercer-street. On 3 December 1794, he passed the qualifying examination of the RCSI. He was commissioned as surgeon " to His Majesty's 44th Regiment, from the 1st Battalion of the Essex Regiment," and he served in the West Indies and also in Egypt.

He retired from the army in 1803, and was admitted to the Membership of RCSI in 1805. He was elected in 1813 Professor of Surgical Pharmacy, and afterwards (in 1819) Professor of Midwifery. For many years Johnston was Treasurer to the College.

See also
 List of presidents of the Royal College of Surgeons in Ireland

References 

Presidents of the Royal College of Surgeons in Ireland
Irish surgeons
1770 births
1833 deaths